Fahrenheit 451 is a 2018 American dystopian drama film directed and co-written by Ramin Bahrani, based on the 1953 book of the same name by Ray Bradbury. It stars Michael B. Jordan, Michael Shannon, Khandi Alexander, Sofia Boutella, Lilly Singh, Grace Lynn Kung and Martin Donovan. Set in a future America, the film follows a "fireman" whose job it is to burn books, which are now illegal, only to question society after meeting a young woman. After premiering at the 2018 Cannes Film Festival, the film aired on HBO on May 19, 2018 receiving mixed critical reviews, with praise for the performances and visuals, but criticism for the screenplay and lack of faithfulness to the source material.

Plot
In the future, after a Second American Civil War, most reading in the United States is confined to the Internet, called "The 9", and most books are banned (except for greatly simplified versions of books such as The Bible, To the Lighthouse and Moby Dick). The fire department is not the same, what it has been. The firemen do not contain fires, because the buildings are safe from fire, they have to burn books. Books are ordered to be burned by "Firemen", who are part of the "Ministry", a totalitarian dictatorship that blames unhappiness, mental illness, and conflicting opinions on reading the "wrong" literature.

Guy Montag is a fireman living in Cleveland and goes about his work without question, believing that by following in his captain's footsteps he is serving and protecting society. All this changes when he meets an informant named Clarisse, who makes him challenge his actions and convictions by sharing some of the real history of the US and the rise of the Ministry with him. When he finally decides to rebel and understand how the "Eels" (book-reading outcasts) read, he comes to a realization—he now wants to read as well. Montag decides to help a rebel who has a plan to reproduce their information through animals. This rebel group encoded books into a starling's DNA so that it can live on and survive the efforts of the firemen. Montag was supposed to steal a transponder from the fire department in order to attach it to the bird so that it can be located by a group of scientists who will transfer the DNA to other animals.

After Montag steals the transponder, fireman Beatty goes to Montag to confirm his intention to continue as a fireman burning books. The firemen go to Montag's house and find a large stash of planted books. On Beatty's orders Montag starts burning the stash. Montag remembers that Captain Beatty was among the group of firemen who beat up his father for being an Eel and stops burning the books. Montag is confronted by Captain Beatty who erases his identity. After burning a fireman alive, Montag finds himself on the run, eventually connecting with the group of Eels. The Eels' house is discovered by the firemen; Montag finds the bird and places a transponder inside it so that it can find its way to scientists in Canada. Captain Beatty confronts him and attempts to stop him, but allows the bird to fly away. After Montag releases the bird, Beatty burns him alive in a fit of rage. The starling makes it to Canada, and joins with an immense flock of other starlings.

Cast
Michael B. Jordan as Guy Montag
Michael Shannon as Captain John Beatty
Sofia Boutella as Clarisse McClellan
Khandi Alexander as Toni Morrison
Lilly Singh as Raven
Martin Donovan as Commissioner Nyari
Andy McQueen as Gustavo
Dylan Taylor as Douglas
Grace Lynn Kung as Chairman Mao
Keir Dullea as Historian
Cindy Katz as Uxie

Production
Ramin Bahrani had been developing an adaptation of Bradbury's novel as early as June 2016. In April 2017, Michael Shannon and Michael B. Jordan were cast in the film, with Jordan also assuming an executive producer role. In June, Sofia Boutella became attached to the project, YouTube personality Lilly Singh was cast as a vlogger, and Laura Harrier was cast as Millie, Montag's wife, though she was ultimately cut from the film. Filming began in July 2017, with the additions of Martin Donovan, Andy McQueen and Grace Lynn Kung to the cast in August.

Release 
On January 11, 2018, HBO's Twitter account released a trailer for the film, featuring the tagline, "Fact. Fiction. It all burns." The film was released on May 19, 2018, after premiering at the 2018 Cannes Film Festival.

It was released on DVD and Blu-ray on September 18, 2018.

Reception
The site's critical consensus reads, "Fahrenheit 451 fails to burn as brightly as its classic source material, opting for slickly mundane smoke-blowing over hard-hitting topical edge." On Metacritic, which assigns a normalized rating to reviews, the film has a score of 47 out of 100, based on 19 critics, indicating "mixed or average reviews".

For IndieWire, Ben Travers gave the film a grade of "C+", writing that "Michael B. Jordan and Michael Shannon make for a compelling pair in an aptly modernized update that still feels far too conventional." Todd McCarthy of The Hollywood Reporter praised the production value but wrote that (referring to the ending of the adaptation) "as disturbing as the forecast for American life and politics may be in Fahrenheit 451, this wrinkle nonetheless serves to seriously diminish the absolute need to preserve texts when they're known to still exist elsewhere; when America gets its head on straight again, there is backup to resupply the intellectually deprived."

In his review for RogerEbert.com, Odie Henderson noted the steering of Bradbury's ideas into the factual realm, drawing parallels with the satirical direction of Network being weakened by the evolution of television, adding that "much of the novel's shock value and allegorical power also feels weakened as a result."

IGNs Matt Fowler wrote that the film "features strong performances and a dancing, flickering visual flare, but all that's not enough to cover up the clunkiness of the script and the strain of reconfiguring this always relevant-yet still very 1950s-story to fit within our 2018 specifics". Entertainment Weeklys Darren Franich wrote that the film "has its heart in the right place, but its head sure crawled up somewhere."

In The Baffler, Alexander Zaitchik described HBO's adaption as "gut[ting] Fahrenheit of its core idea ... roughly akin to a GlaxoSmithKline production of Aldous Huxley’s Brave New World."

Accolades

See also
 Fahrenheit 451 (1966 film)

References

External links
 
 
 
 
 

2018 films
HBO Films films
American dystopian films
Films based on American novels
Films based on science fiction novels
Films directed by Ramin Bahrani
Films based on works by Ray Bradbury
Films about censorship
Films about totalitarianism
Films set in Cleveland
Films set in Ohio
Films shot in Toronto
Films about bibliophilia
2018 drama films
American drama television films
2010s English-language films
2010s American films